Yumkham Erabot Singh is a politician from Manipur, India. He was elected to the Manipur Legislative Assembly as the Indian National Congress candidate in the constituency Wangkhei since 1980.

In September 2016, Singh announced his decision to leave the Indian National Congress and joined Bharatiya Janata Party ahead of 2017 Manipur Legislative Assembly election.

References 

Indian National Congress politicians
Living people
Manipur politicians
Bharatiya Janata Party politicians from Manipur
Year of birth missing (living people)
Manipur MLAs 2012–2017
Manipur MLAs 2007–2012
Manipur MLAs 2002–2007
Manipur MLAs 1995–2000
National People's Party (India) politicians
Manipur MLAs 1980–1984
Manipur MLAs 1985–1990
Manipur MLAs 2017–2022